PBSC Urban Solutions, formerly the Public Bike System Company, is an international bicycle-sharing system equipment vendor with their headquarters based in Longueuil, Quebec. The company develops bicycle-sharing systems, equipment, parts, and software, and sells its products to cities in Canada, the United States, the United Kingdom, Spain, Brazil and more. The company has sold about 100,000 bikes and 8,500 stations to 45 cities.

Public Bike System Company (PBSC) was initially created by the City of Montreal to supply and operate its public bike share system under the brand Bixi (later becoming Bixi Montréal), which was introduced in 2009. The name 'Bixi' is a portmanteau of 'bicycle' and 'taxi'. Starting in 2010, PBSC began to export the Bixi brand of bike-share systems to various other cities.

Bruno Rodi purchased the international division in April 2014 and renamed the company to PBSC Urban Solutions. (Montreal's on-the-ground Bixi bike-share operations were not included in the sale, and were reorganized under the Bixi Montréal name.) In 2015, he sold the majority share to Luc Sabbatini, who became CEO. Since then, PBSC Urban Solutions has extended its activity into additional cities. As of 2022, PBSC bikes and e-bikes can be found in 45 cities around the world, including Barcelona, New York, Aspen, Dubai, Toronto, Madrid, London, Detroit, São Paulo, Buenos Aires, just to name a few.

On May 17, 2022, Lyft, Inc. acquired PBSC Urban Solutions for $160 million.

History 
In 2007, the city of Montreal published the "Reinvent Montreal" transportation plan, which featured a bike sharing system as a method of reducing automobile dependence. To design and operate the new system, the city created the Public Bike System Company (PBSC). This was a private non-profit company overseen by Stationnement de Montréal (the Montreal parking authority).

After the 2008 implementation of the system in Montreal, solutions like Bixi began expanding around the world. PBSC's systems are now found across North America, Latin America, Europe and more.

In May 2009, the system began operation in Montreal, with 3000 bicycles and 300 stations. After several expansions and the integration of electric bikes, in 2021 the Montreal system has 9,092 bikes and e-bikes and 750 stations.

From June to September 2009, the system was introduced in a pilot study in Ottawa/Gatineau. This was followed by operations in Melbourne, Australia from May 2010, Minneapolis (MN), in June 2010, and London in July 2010. PBSC launched on the Washington State University campus in August 2010, in Washington, D.C. & Arlington under the name "Capital Bikeshare" in September 2010.

In 2011, PBSC implemented a bike-sharing system in Boston under the name "Hubway" and in Toronto, under the name "Bike Share Toronto".

In 2012, the company expanded to Chattanooga, USA.

In 2013, the company continues its expansion in the United States by implementing systems in Chicago, New York and Aspen.

In 2014, PBSC Urban Solutions expands its activities to Guadalajara, Mexico where it deploys 1,276 bikes and 122 stations. As of 2021, the city has 3,200 bikes and 305 stations.

On January 20, 2014, the company filed for bankruptcy in Montreal, citing $46 million in debt. Part of the issue in the bankruptcy was that Chicago and New York were withholding $5 million in payments because of software issues with the docking stations. Over the course of 2014, Bruno Rodi purchased the international division of Bixi and renamed it to PBSC Urban Solutions. Luc Sabbatini became CEO of the company in January 2015.

In 2015, the company announced that it was making a $2 million investment in Research & Development. That same year, PBSC rolled out its solutions in Toluca, Mexico and announced the expansion of its existing networks in London, Chicago, Washington and Guadalajara.

In 2016, PBSC Urban Solutions added a new pedal-assist electric bike to its potfolio, and rebranded two of its existing bikes. That same year, the company implemented its solution in Kona, U.S. and expanded in Toronto, Chicago, Washington and Aspen.

In 2017, the company deployed its first system in Brazil in the city of Recife, which consisted of 800 bikes and 80 stations. The company also rolled out its systems in Detroit, Louisville, Tucson & Honolulu in the United States, and Aruba in the Caribbean. 

In 2018, the company announced a second R&D investment of more than $5 million. New systems were launched in Valence, France and Nicosia, Cyprus' capital. Thanks to its partnership with Tembici and Itaú Unibanco operators, PBSC expanded its network in Brazil with the deployment of 9,000 bikes in several cities: Rio de Janeiro, São Paulo, Porto Alegre, Vila Velha and Salvador. 

In 2019, PBSC Urban Solutions was awarded a 7,000 bike contract in Barcelona, 1,000 of them being electric assisted bikes. The same year the company expanded to Monaco, Buenos Aires in Argentina, and Santiago in Chile. It also extended some of its existing systems, including BIXI in Montreal, We-Cycle in Aspen and Libélo in Valence.  

In 2020, PBSC entered the Middle East with the launch of Careem Bike, a fully electric system, in Dubai. In the same year, it also implemented its solution in San Sebastian, Spain.   

In 2021, PBSC broadened its activities in several cities around the world: Abu Dhabi in the United Arab Emirates, Clermont-Ferrand in France, Sibiu in Romania, Quebec City in Canada and in Brasilia, the capital of Brazil.

In 2022, the company reached new territories in Colombia and Romania, rolling out its solutions in the cities of Bogota, Dej, and Sibiu. It also expanded some of its existing networks, including BIXI in Montreal, Careem Bike in Dubai, Santander Cycles in London, Bike Share Toronto in Toronto, Biki in Honolulu, àVélo in Québec City, Bike Itau in São Paulo, and Libélo in Valence.   

On April 19, 2022, Lyft announced that it had reached an agreement to acquire PBSC. The transaction closed on May 17, 2022.

In 2023, PBSC Urban Solutions launched bicimad, a fully electric system in Madrid, Spain, and Biki in Valladolid, Spain.

Original developers 
8D Technologies developed the technological platform behind the Bixi system, including the wireless bike station terminals, the RFID bike dock technology and the software systems. The system runs on a combination of solar energy and grid charged batteries. 8D also created the Spotcycle bike-share smartphone app that locates and shows the status of bike stations close to the users. 
Michel Dallaire designed the physical components.
Robotics Design designed the bike docks and the locking system.
Cycles Devinci manufactures PBSC's bikes in the Saguenay-Lac-Saint-Jean region of Quebec.
Michel Gourdeau suggested the name Bixi, a portmanteau of bicycle and taxi, which was selected by a majority of the people who participated in a contest organized by the city of Montreal.

Current systems 
The cities that currently use PBSC bike-share systems are listed below:

Equipment 

A complete station is made up of a payment kiosk, bikes, and bike docks (where the bikes are locked). A station can be installed and configured in about half an hour; no excavation is required beforehand. Ordinary stations use solar power during the day and a rechargeable battery at night. Stations which can charge e-bikes, however, must be connected to an electrical power source.

Bike docks 
Bike docks hold and lock the bikes when they are not in use. Each dock includes a button which can be used to notify staff if a bicycle is defective. There are different types of stations:

 The electric stations which are powered by the electrical network and range from 100 V to 240 V.
 The solar stations which are modular and self-sufficient in energy.

Payment kiosks 
PBSC's payment kiosks are touchscreen-operated; most of them accept credit cards for short-term rentals. Users can unlock bikes using a numeric one-time PIN number generated by the payment kiosk or an app. Long-term subscribers also have the option to unlock a bike using a subscriber key, which works using contactless RFID ("tap") technology.

Bikes 

The bicycles are utility bicycles; they have a unisex step-through frame with an upright seating position. They are equipped with grip-shifter-operated internally-geared hubs, drum brakes, mudguards/fenders, chain guard, generator lights, and a front rack.

The one-piece aluminum frame and handlebars conceal cables and fasteners, in an effort to protect them from vandalism and inclement weather. The tires are designed to be puncture-resistant and are filled with nitrogen to maintain proper inflation pressure longer. Twin LED rear lights are integrated into the robust frame, which weighs approximately 18 kg. The bikes were designed by Michel Dallaire; they are built in the Saguenay, Quebec region by Cycles Devinci.

Four bike models are available. These include:

 The "ICONIC". This is PBSC's original bike model. It has 26" wheels, and is heavy but sturdy.
 The "FIT". This is a newer model. It is lighter-weight and has 24" wheels.
 The "BOOST". This is PBSC's original e-bike.
 The "E-FIT". This is a newer e-bike.
The "BOOST" and the "E-FIT" each include a 250 watt motor.

Each bike is also equipped with PBSC's patented anti-theft locking device. It can charge e-bikes batteries and communicate data in real-time to the control center.

Multimodal solution 
The multimodal solution is a technology designed to dock and charge various vehicles (bikes, e-scooters, e-bikes) at a single station, by installing PBSC's patented locking device on the vehicles.

Technologies

PBSC mobile app 
The official PBSC bicycle-rental app is now called "PBSC"; it was formerly called "CycleFinder". It can be used to unlock bikes (with the QR code), find nearby stations, find available bikes or empty docks, find a route to a destination, and more, all in real time.

The app can be customized to each city's operators.

Transit App 
PBSC Urban Solutions also has a partnership with "Transit App"; this app can also be used to find stations and unlock bikes.

Comet 
Comet is a software program developed by PBSC. The control center allows operators to manage in real-time the system as it is connected to every station and bike. The software shares data about the system's bikes and stations status (need for maintenance, station current capacity), location of bikes, user profile (regular or occasional users).

2014 bankruptcy 
In 2013, PBSC began having financial problems; the company filed for bankruptcy in early 2014. In January 2014, Bixi filed for bankruptcy in Montreal, citing $46 million in debt. Part of the issue in the bankruptcy was that Chicago and New York were withholding $5 million in payments because of software issues with the docking stations. In February 2014, the city of Montreal bought all Bixi assets, with the intention of selling the international division of the bankrupt company. On April 9, 2014, Bruno Rodi, a Quebec businessman, bought Bixi's international division for $4 million and renamed it PBSC Urban Solutions.

Operational difficulties 
Several cities experienced hurdles in implementing Bixi systems.

A trial implementation in Ottawa and Gatineau took place in the summer of 2009, with 50 bikes and four stations available until September 2009.  While the trial was successful, they did not return in 2010 since no company wanted to manage the project as the National Capital Commission wanted the contractor to buy the bicycles and locking stations. The project was revived, however, and 100 bikes and 10 stations were launched in spring 2011.

Bixi's franchise in central Boston includes the right to negotiate to expand the system to neighboring municipalities. Central Boston will be served by a network that includes 2,500 bikes, and 290 stations with 3,750 docking spaces, with the potential to expand to a 5,000-bike system. The system was delayed, partly because of a lack of funding, but launched in Spring 2011 with 610 bikes and 61 stations. It has since grown into the neighboring communities of Brookline, Cambridge and Somerville. They had initially planned to set up a Bixi system directly, but now are using Alta Bicycle Share, of Portland, Oregon, to set it up. Alta Bicycle Share uses the same bicycles and stations that are used in Bixi through the Public Bike System Company.

The Bixi system in Montreal experienced some initial difficulties less than two months after its introduction in 2009, with damage and vandalism to some of the bikes. The newspaper La Presse reported on July 5, 2009, that one in five bikes had been damaged and 15% of bike racks are defective. Stationnement de Montréal communications director Michel Philibert stated the organization plans to reinforce racks and is testing prototype designs. Designer Michel Dallaire stated it never occurred to him that people would try to break the stations to steal bikes.
 There have since been no significant damage or vandalism issues reported in any of the installations of Bixi.

In 2012 a legal dispute over software from 8D Technologies led to implementation delays for Chattanooga, New York and San Francisco.

In 2013 it was reported that the Toronto Bixi system was facing financial troubles and would be operated by Toronto Parking Authority in 2014 under a different name. The system had only paid back $600,000 of its $4,500,000 start up loan. The unexpectedly rapid expansion of export business created cash flow problems for the parent company, PBSC Urban Solutions, which attempted to sell its international operations in June.

Effects 
A study published in the American Journal of Public Health reports observing:

a greater likelihood of cycling for those exposed to the public bicycle-share program after the second season of implementation (odds ratio = 2.86; 95% confidence interval = 1.85, 4.42) after we controlled for weather, built environment, and individual variables.
In 2021, a study by Colorado State University in the United-States reported that the usage of bike share systems resulted in a calculated reduction of 4.7 premature deaths, 737 DALYS (disability-adjusted life years) and 36 million dollars (USD) in health economic impacts across the country annually.

See also 

 Alternatives to the automobile 
 Sustainable transport 
 Electric bicycle 
 Road cycling 
 List of cycling topics
 Bicycle sharing system
B-cycle - owned by Wisconsin bicycle maker Trek, health insurer Humana, and advertising firm Crispin Porter Bogusky
List of bicycle sharing systems
Utility cycling § Short-term hire schemes
Stockholm City Bikes (Stockholm, Sweden)
Vélib’ (Paris, France)
Vélo'v (Lyon, France)
 Carsharing
 Outline of cycling

References

External links 
 

Companies based in Longueuil
Transport companies of Canada
Canadian companies established in 2009
Transport companies established in 2009
Bicycle sharing companies
2009 establishments in Quebec
Cycling in Canada
Cycling in London
Cycling in Toronto
Transport in Ottawa
Transport in Montreal
Micromobility
Sustainable technologies
2022 mergers and acquisitions